Hidden Valley is a residential neighbourhood in the northwest quadrant of Calgary, Alberta. It is located close to the northern edge of the city, and is bounded by Stoney Trail to the north, Beddington Trail to the east, Country Hills Boulevard to the south, and Shaganappi Trail to the west.

Hidden Valley was established in 1990. It is represented in the Calgary City Council by the Ward 3 councillor.

History 
Hidden Valley was the vicinity of a double homicide in July 2018.

The First House built in Hidden Valley was in 1991.

Demographics

Residents in this community had a median household income of $78,127 in 2000, and there were 6.4% low income residents living in the neighbourhood. As of 2000, 20.6% of the residents were immigrants. All buildings were single-family detached homes, and 2.1% of the housing was used for renting.

Education
The community is served by public schools Hidden Valley Elementary (K-3), Valley Creek Middle (4-9), Crescent Heights High (10-12) and Catholic schools St. Elizabeth Seton (K-9), Notre Dame High School (10-12).

Politics 
Hidden Valley covered by the Provincial Electoral District Calgary-Beddington represented in the Legislative Assembly of Alberta by Josephine Pon of the United Conservative Party.

See also
List of neighbourhoods in Calgary

References

External links
Calgary Communities - Hidden Valley Community Association

Neighbourhoods in Calgary